The Georgia State Panthers women's basketball team represents Georgia State University and competes in the Sun Belt Conference of NCAA Division I. The Panthers play at the GSU Sports Arena in Atlanta, Georgia, United States.

Coaches

Team records

Most wins – 28 during the 1980–1981 season
Longest Winning Streak – 10 games during the 2002–03 regular season.

Post season tournament results

NCAA tournament results
Georgia State has been to the NCAA tournament three times. Their combined record is 0–3.

NIT results
Georgia State has been to the Women's NIT one time. Their record is 0–1.

AIAW results
Georgia State has appeared in one AIAW Tournament. Their record is 0–1.

School records

Game

Most points – 52 by Sheryl Martin (vs. Stetson) on February 18, 1983
Most 3-pointers made – 8 by Lina Noufena (vs. Stetson) on February 14, 2002
Most free throws made – 17 by Leslie McElrath (vs. Mercer) on February 13, 1999
Most rebounds – ?????Tied, both by Angela Gresham vs. Mercer on January 28, 1987 and vs Massachusetts on December 19, 1988
Most assists – 16 by Denise Lloyd (vs. VCU) on February 13, 1981
Most blocks – 11 by Marcquitta Head (vs. Hofstra) on December 3, 2006
Most steals – Tied 2 ways at 9, by Brittany Hollins (vs. VCU) on January 13, 2006, and by Jylisa Williams (vs. Delaware State) on December 21, 2008
Nikki Powers- 7,000,000

Season

Most points – 771 by Terese Allen during the 1980–81 season
Most free throws made – 170 by Maxine Farmer during the 1983–84 season
Highest free throw percentage – .874 by Marica Maddox during the 1999–00 season
Highest rebound average – 15.1 by Angela Gresham during the 1984–85 season
Most assists – 199 by Denise Lloyd during the 1980–81 season
Most blocks – 67 by Marcquitta Head during the 2006–07 season
Most steals – 98 by Brittany Hollins during the 2006–07 season

References

External links